Richard George Taylor (born 3 January 1945 in Coventry) is a British former long-distance runner.

Athletics career
He competed in the 1968 Summer Olympics.

He represented England in the 3 miles event, at the 1966 British Empire and Commonwealth Games in Kingston, Jamaica.

Four years later, he competed in the 10,000 metres and won a bronze medal at the Commonwealth Games in Edinburgh.
He was prominent at the 1969 International Cross Country Championships, taking the silver medal behind Gaston Roelants to lead the English men to the team title. He was also a team gold medallist at the 1967 and 1970 editions.

References

1945 births
Living people
Sportspeople from Coventry
English male long-distance runners
Olympic athletes of Great Britain
Athletes (track and field) at the 1968 Summer Olympics
Commonwealth Games medallists in athletics
Athletes (track and field) at the 1966 British Empire and Commonwealth Games
Athletes (track and field) at the 1970 British Commonwealth Games
Commonwealth Games bronze medallists for England
Medallists at the 1970 British Commonwealth Games